Robert Lawrence McFadden (August 25, 1929 – November 18, 2010) was an American politician in the state of South Carolina. He served in the South Carolina House of Representatives as a member of the Democratic Party from 1961 to 1980, representing York County, South Carolina. He is a lawyer. He died in 2010.

References

1929 births
2010 deaths
Democratic Party members of the South Carolina House of Representatives
South Carolina lawyers
People from Camden, South Carolina
People from York County, South Carolina
20th-century American lawyers